Libri is a quarterly peer-reviewed academic journal covering library science and information studies. It was established in 1950 and is published by De Gruyter Saur. The editors-in-chief are Kendra S. Albright and Theo J.D. Bothma.

Abstracting and indexing
The journal is abstracted and indexed in:

According to the Journal Citation Reports, the journal has a 2021 impact factor of 0.667.

References

External links

De Gruyter academic journals
Publications established in 1950
Quarterly journals
English-language journals
Library science journals